Timothy David Yeo (born 19 October 2000) is a Singaporean footballer.

Career statistics

Club

Notes

References

Living people
2000 births
Singaporean footballers
Singaporean sportspeople of Chinese descent
Association football forwards
Singapore Premier League players
Hougang United FC players